Ettore Mattia (30 May 1910 – 10 October 1982) was an Italian journalist and actor.

Life and career 
Born in Potenza, Mattia was a journalist and a film critic for several newspapers and magazines, and was also press officer of Titanus.

Mattia was mainly active as a character actor, and in 1969 he won a Nastro d'Argento for best supporting actor for his performance in Luciano Salce's La pecora nera. He died of heart attack.

Filmography

References

External links 

1910 births
People from Potenza
1982 deaths
Nastro d'Argento winners
Italian male film actors
Italian male journalists
Italian film critics
20th-century Italian male actors
20th-century Italian journalists
20th-century Italian male writers